66-68 Bettington Street is a heritage-listed Edwardian terrace house located at 66-68 Bettington Street, in the inner city Sydney suburb of Millers Point in the City of Sydney local government area of New South Wales, Australia. It was added to the New South Wales State Heritage Register on 2 April 1999.

History 
Millers Point is one of the earliest areas of European settlement in Australia, and a focus for maritime activities. An 1885 Trig. survey shows an earlier single residence with front verandah on this site. 1900 Resumption plans show vacant site owned by Bridget Carinan. The pair of Edwardian terraces built here soon after, and today they are mostly intact. They were first tenanted by NSW Department of Housing in 1986.

Description 
66-68 Bettington Street is a fine two-storey, three bedroom Edwardian terrace with tiled verandah, coloured glass windows, slate roof and timber and cast iron verandahs.

Heritage listing 
This is one of a pair of fine Edwardian terraces, constructed  with original external detailing intact.

It is part of the Millers Point Conservation Area, which is an intact residential and maritime precinct. It contains residential buildings and civic spaces dating from the 1830s and is an important example of nineteenth-century adaptation of the landscape.

Edwardian Terrace was listed on the New South Wales State Heritage Register on 2 April 1999.

See also 

Australian residential architectural styles

References

Bibliography

Attribution

External links

 

New South Wales State Heritage Register sites located in Millers Point
Edwardian architecture in Australia
Terraced houses in Sydney
Articles incorporating text from the New South Wales State Heritage Register
Millers Point Conservation Area